"So Pretty" is a 1968 anti-war song by Leonard Bernstein to lyrics by Betty Comden and Adolph Green, contributed to a Broadway for Peace fundraiser on January 21, 1968, at Lincoln Center's Philharmonic Hall. The song was performed by Barbra Streisand dressed in a gingham smock and fisherman's hat and accompanied by the composer at the piano.

Recordings
Deborah Voigt on All My Heart - Deborah Voigt Sings American Songs Angel Records 2005
David Daniels on A Quiet Thing - Songs For Voice And Guitar Craig Ogden Virgin Classics 2003

References

1968 songs
Songs with music by Leonard Bernstein
Songs with lyrics by Betty Comden
Songs with lyrics by Adolph Green